Leonard Geard (born 12 February 1934) is an English retired professional footballer who played in the Football League for Brentford as a wing half.

Career 
A wing half, Geard began his career in the youth system at Fulham, but departed in March 1953, without making a first team appearance. Geard transferred to Fulham's West London rivals Brentford, but due to having to undertake his National Service, he was unable to make his professional debut until 27 April 1955, in a 1–1 Third Division South draw with Crystal Palace. He made a further three appearances during the 1955–56 season, before being released at the end of the campaign. Geard dropped into non-League football and signed for Southern League club Kettering Town, with whom he won the 1956–57 division title.

Career statistics

Honours 
Kettering Town

 Southern League: 1956–57

References

1934 births
Footballers from Hammersmith
English footballers
Brentford F.C. players
English Football League players
Fulham F.C. players
Kettering Town F.C. players
Association football wing halves
Southern Football League players
Living people